Mansfield is an English surname derived from Mansfield in Nottinghamshire or a similar toponym. It can also be a variant of the surname Mansell or Maunsell, as can be illustrated by the case of the politician and Royal Navy Admiral Sir Robert Mansell.

Notable people with this surname include the following:

Sir Alan Mansfield (1902–1980), Australian judge, Governor of Queensland
Arabella Mansfield (1846–1911), first American female lawyer
Brian Mansfield (born 1963), American writer and journalist
Bruce Mansfield (born 1944), Australian television and radio personality
Charles Mansfield (disambiguation)
Comins Mansfield (1896–1984), British chess player and problem composer
Darrell Mansfield, American gospel and blues musician
David Mansfield (born 1956), American musician
Edward Mansfield (disambiguation)
Edwin Mansfield, (1930–1997), economist, professor at the University of Pennsylvania
Eric Mansfield (disambiguation)
Eversley Mansfield (1886–1954), English footballer
Fred Mansfield (1915–1992), English footballer
Frederick Mansfield (1877–1958), American politician, Mayor of Boston
George Allen Mansfield (1834–1908), Australian architect
Gordon H. Mansfield (1941–2013), American Army veteran, Deputy United States Secretary of Veterans Affairs
Harvey Mansfield (born 1932), American professor of government and conservative political commentator
Henry Mansfield (died 1328), English medieval theologian, philosopher, churchman, and university chancellor
Sir James Mansfield (1733–1821), British lawyer, judge and politician
James Mansfield (cricketer, born 1860) (1860–1930), Tasmanian cricketer
James Mansfield (cricketer, born 1862) (1862–1932), English cricketer
Jared Mansfield (1759–1830), American mathematician and surveyor
Jaymes Mansfield (born 1990), American drag queen and TV personality
Jayne Mansfield (1933–1967), American actress and sex symbol
Jayne Marie Mansfield (born 1950), American actress and model
Jeremy Mansfield (1963–2022), South African radio and television personality
Jerry Mansfield (1892–1960), American football player
John Mansfield (disambiguation)
Joseph K. Mansfield (1803–1862), Union army general in the American Civil War
Joseph J. Mansfield (1861–1947), American Congress representative from Texas
Katherine Mansfield (1888–1923), New Zealand author
Keith Mansfield (born 1941), British composer and arranger
Keith Mansfield (writer) (born 1965), English writer and publisher
Ken Mansfield (born 1937), American record executive
Marie Mansfield (born 1931), American baseball player
Martha Mansfield (1899–1923), American actress
Michael Mansfield (born 1941), English barrister
Michael Mansfield (footballer) (born 1971), former Australian rules footballer
Mike Mansfield (1903–2001), American politician and diplomat
Maureen and Mike Mansfield Foundation, named after Mike Mansfield, dedicated to "advancing understanding and cooperation in U.S.-Asia relations"
Sir Peter Mansfield (1933–2017), British physicist and pioneer of MRI
Portia Mansfield (1887–1979), American dance educator and choreographer
Ray Mansfield (1941–1996), American football player
Richard Mansfield (1857–1907), Anglo-American stage actor
Sally Mansfield (1920–2001), American actress
Shaylee Mansfield (born 2009), deaf American actress and YouTuber
Stephen Mansfield (born 1958), American author
Tony Mansfield (hurler) (1939–2013), Irish hurler
Tony Mansfield (born 1955), English songwriter, musician and record producer
Walter R. Mansfield (1911–1987), American federal judge
Wayne Mansfield, Australian-based marketer and convicted spammer
William Mansfield, 1st Baron Sandhurst (1819–1876), British Army general

Other uses
Lord Mansfield (William Murray, 1st Earl of Mansfield) (1705–1793), British jurist; presided over Somersett's Case, which confirmed that slavery was not recognised by English law

References 

English-language surnames
English toponymic surnames